Amel Khamtache (born May 4, 1981 in Béjaïa) is an Algerian indoor volleyball and beach volleyball player.

Club information
Current club:  GSP (formerly known as MCA)
Former club:  NC Béjaïa

References
FIVB Player Biography

Living people
Algerian women's volleyball players
1981 births
Volleyball players from Béjaïa
Olympic volleyball players of Algeria
Volleyball players at the 2012 Summer Olympics
21st-century Algerian people